Kioumars Derambakhsh (born December 25, 1945, in Tehran – died March 31, 2020, in Paris) was an Iranian filmmaker, producer, writer and photographer. He was the brother of Kambiz Darmakhsh, a well-known Iranian cartoonist. "Blind Owl + Life and Death of Sadegh Hedayat" starring Parviz Fanizadeh is one of the most famous films he has directed. He has made more than 100 documentaries and features films in European and Asian Countries since 1973.

Life 
Kioumars Derambakhsh moved to France in 1969 to study photography and cinema at the same time. Then he returned to Iran and started photographing in cinemas. Among his works in the field of photography, we can mention two films, Deer and Tangsir. Kioumars is known in the cinema as a writer, director, producer, editor, and photographer. He was a documentary filmmaker.

Arash Derambakhsh (French politician) is his son.

Films 

 The Bell (Jaras)
 The Blind Owl: Life and Death of Sadegh Hedayat (1975)
 The Spring Journey
 Sarbanan Kavir
 Iran is the land of religions
 The stone is raised
 Holy stone gardens
 Magical lithographs
 The Eclipse
 Boncou, Tribal Postman
 Heavenly migration
 Turkmen's Secrets
 Shepherd Man
 The World Is My Home
 Ascension (Rising to Heaven)
 The Color of Blood is Red
 Megalithic Mysteries
 Meeting Jesus Christ
 My Heart Bam
 Soil & Silk
 Voyage to Persia
 On the roof of Asia
 The Music Garden
 Fish & Stone
 The Oriental Dreams
 Secrets of Khaajoo Bridge
 Eight Edens
 Dream of an island
 Warning
 Bakhtiari
 Zaroastrian
 Blue Dream
 Vang Cathedral
 Secrets of Persepolis
 Qashghaie Tribe Bride
 Sunni Minority
 Wilderness Of Loneliness
 Pasargad
 The Iranian Lady
 The Garden of Paradise
 The Pigeon House Tower
 A 13-part series about the introduction of Iran's cultural heritage

Death 
Kioumars died of coronavirus 2020 in Paris, France, on April 3, 2016, at the age of 74.

References

External links 

 
 Official website

1945 births
2020 deaths
Iranian directors
Iranian photographers
Iranian male writers
Writers from Tehran
Deaths from the COVID-19 pandemic in France